Pinus pinceana, with the common names weeping pinyon and Pince's pinyon pine, is a species of conifer in the family Pinaceae.

Distribution
This pine species is endemic to Mexico, in the states of: Durango; northern Coahuila, Nuevo León, and Zacatecas; central San Luis Potosí; and southern Querétaro and Hidalgo.

Description
Pinus pinceana forms a small tree or large shrub. Seeds are edible but produced infrequently.

It is an IUCN Red List Near threatened species, endangered by habitat loss.

References

 Current IUCN Red List of all Threatened Species

pinceana
Endemic flora of Mexico
Flora of Coahuila
Flora of Durango
Flora of Hidalgo (state)
Flora of Nuevo León
Flora of Querétaro
Flora of San Luis Potosí
Flora of Zacatecas
Trees of Mexico
Near threatened biota of Mexico
Taxonomy articles created by Polbot
Flora of the Sierra Madre Oriental